Néstor Alves da Silva (born 23 June 1926), known as just Néstor, was a Brazilian footballer. He played in three matches for the Brazil national football team in 1956. He was also part of Brazil's squad for the 1956 South American Championship.

References

External links
 

1926 births
Possibly living people
Brazilian footballers
Brazil international footballers
Place of birth missing (living people)
Association footballers not categorized by position